This is a list of Croatian television related events from 1962.

Events

Debuts

Television shows

Ending this year

Births
21 April - Zlatan Zuhrić, actor, comedian & TV host
7 August - Željko Pervan, comedian & actor
22 October - Mirko Fodor, TV host & actor

Deaths